Loughborough Corinthians F.C. were an English football club based in Loughborough, Leicestershire, that played in the Midland League.

Former players
1. Players that have played/managed in the Football League or any foreign equivalent to this level (i.e. fully professional league).2. Players with full international caps.3. Players that hold a club record or have captained the club.
 Jackie Belton
 Adam Plunkett
 Jack Sheffield
 Jock Scott

References

Defunct football clubs in England
Defunct football clubs in Leicestershire
Sport in Loughborough
Central Combination
Midland Football League (1889)
Leicestershire Senior League
Central Alliance